Don't Burst My Bubble may refer to:

"Don't Burst My Bubble", an episode of the television series Scorpion
"Don't Burst My Bubble", a previously unreleased song included on the 2012 deluxe edition of Small Faces, the debut album by the British rock band the Small Faces